Mark Wylea Erwin (born 30 March,1944) is a former U.S. ambassador and the president of Erwin Capital, Inc., a family-owned investment company in Charlotte, North Carolina.

Career
In 1997, Bill Clinton appointed him to the board of directors of the Overseas Private Investment Corporation. From 1999-2001 Erwin served as Ambassador to the Republic of Mauritius, the Republic of the Seychelles and the Federal Islamic Republic of the Comoros.

Erwin's books include An Unlikely Journey - Make a Difference. Do Good. Have Fun, Life's Lessons: Lines of Wisdom from a Faithful Stream, and The Practical Ambassador. He also wrote a collection of "For the Journey" books, including Faith For the Journey, Collected Wisdom For the Journey, and Humor For the Journey. Erwin was an Adjunct Professor at the Business School of Winthrop University for several years.

Erwin studied real estate at the University of Tennessee, and in 1969 became a real estate administrator for United Parcel Service. He served four years in the United States Air Force. In 2017, North Carolina Governor Roy Cooper appointed Erwin to the North Carolina Banking Commission.

References

External links
 AmericanAmbassadors.org
 History.State.gov

Living people
American chief executives of financial services companies
Businesspeople from Charlotte, North Carolina
People from Coral Gables, Florida
Ambassadors of the United States to Seychelles
Ambassadors of the United States to Mauritius
Ambassadors of the United States to the Comoros
20th-century American diplomats
21st-century American diplomats
1944 births